Hanham is a village.

Hanham may also refer to:

Hanham baronets
Hanham Lock

People with the surname
James Hanham (1840–1923), American chess player
Joan Hanham, Baroness Hanham (born 1939), British politician